Kiehlia is a genus of fungi in the family Parmulariaceae. The genus was first described by Ahmés Pinto Viégas in 1944.

References

External links 

 Kiehlia at Index Fungorum

Parmulariaceae